Naphthalene-2-sulfonic acid is an organic compound with the formula C10H7SO3H.  A colorless, water-soluble solid, it is often available as the mono- and trihydrates C10H7SO3H.2H2O.  It is one of two monosulfonic acids of naphthalene, the other being naphthalene-1-sulfonic acid.  The compound is mainly used in the production of dyes via nitration en route to aminonaphthalenesulfonic acids.  The compound is prepared by sulfonation of naphthalene with sulfuric acid, however under equilibrating conditions that allow the 1-sulfonic acid isomer to convert to the more stable 2-sulfonic acid. 

Naphthalene-2-sulfonic acid undergoes many reactions, some of which are or were of commercial interest.  Fusion with sodium hydroxide followed by acidification gives 2-naphthol. It is an intermediate in the formation of 2,6-, 2,7- and 1,6-naphthalene disulfonic acids as well as 1,3,6-naphthalenetrisulfonic acid.  Naphthalene-2-sulfonic acid condenses with formaldehyde to give polymeric sulfonic acids.

References

Naphthalenesulfonic acids
2-Naphthyl compounds